Cucullosporella is a genus of fungi in the family Halosphaeriaceae. This is a monotypic genus, containing the single species Cucullosporella mangrovei.

References

Monotypic Sordariomycetes genera